Karchak may refer to:
 Karchak-e Larijani
 Karchak-e Navai